Frank Drozak (December 24, 1927 - June 21, 1988) was an American labor leader.  He was president of the Seafarers International Union (SIU) from 1980 until his death in 1988.  Drozak was also president of the AFL-CIO Maritime Trades Department.

See also

 Michael Sacco
 Harry Lundeberg
 Paul Hall (labor leader)
 Seafarers International Union

References

External links

American trade union leaders
1927 births
1988 deaths
People from Alexandria, Virginia
Seafarers International Union of North America people
Trade unionists from Alabama
People from Mobile, Alabama